The native form of this personal name is Moldova György. This article uses the Western name order.

György Moldova (12 March 1934 – 4 June 2022) was the author of more than seventy books in Hungary that have collectively sold more than 13 million copies, more than any other Hungarian writer. He is best known for his richly detailed sociological nonfiction focusing on everyday life and concerns within specific industries or professions (e.g., railway, mining, and law enforcement) and in particular regions of Hungary—thoroughly researched works that draw on the author's travels and his interviews with participants.

Also popular for his satirical works, Moldova received numerous honors in his native land, including the Kossuth Prize. His books include plays and novels as well; among the latter is Sötét angyal (Dark Angel), published in English translation in 1967 (Corvina Press, Budapest). One of his nonfiction books is being published in August 2012 as Ballpoint: A Tale of Genius and Grit, Perilous Times, and the Invention that Changed the Way We Write (New Europe Books, North Adams, Massachusetts). Moldova lived in Budapest.

Life and literary legacy 
Given the name György Reif at birth, the future author and his parents, being of Jewish descent, were interned within Budapest's Jewish ghetto in late 1944 until the end of World War II. He later studied at Budapest's College of Theatre and Drama, leaving in 1957 soon before finishing, after a fellow student and a teacher of his were imprisoned following the 1956 Revolution; Moldova was not awarded his degree. Both during his college studies and after, he also held a range of jobs—as a furnace repairman, miner, gardener, canning factory worker, and teacher in reform schools.
Starting in 1958 Moldova worked for years as a screenwriter and playwright, making little headway in the former pursuit but seeing his plays staged in theaters to considerable success. His stories had been appearing in literary journals and anthologies since 1955.

In addition to his many books and plays over the decades, Moldova has published numerous pieces in the Budapest satirical biweekly Hócipő since 1989. In the early 1990s he also wrote weekly pieces for the Budapest daily newspaper Magyar Hirlap.

Moldova's writing is characterized by a concern for the central issues of everyday life, action, and characters who count as solitary, everyday heroes—with his nonfiction steeped in a tradition comparable to the New Journalism. His nonfiction books in particular, often on matters of practical concern to millions of Hungarians, have made him a household name.
While occupying the fringes of Hungary's traditional literary establishment, Moldova is held in much esteem as a writer by readers from all sectors of Hungarian society, including some who otherwise take exception to his outspoken leftist/communist sympathies.

Foreign responses 

As for foreign responses to his work, the English-language translation of Moldova's book on the invention of the ballpoint pen (New Europe Books, 2012) has elicited comments from outside of Hungary, including:

"Ballpoint reads like a fast-paced mystery. Although we know from the start that its technological protagonist—the ballpoint pen—will triumph, we find ourselves repeatedly surprised by the story's unfolding episodes of international intrigue, financial deception, and legal shenanigans." 
—Henry Petroski, author of The Pencil and The Essential Engineer

"The tale of László Bíró and Andor Goy and their development of the ballpoint pen is a wonderful illustration of the role that human passions, foibles, and genius play in shaping the world around us." 
—Robert Friedel, author of Zipper: an Exploration in Novelty

Political controversy 
In 1988, in his book Bűn az élet (Life is Crime), Moldova addressed a sensitive subject that, with widely varying interpretations, is on the minds of many Hungarians: the relatively high crime rate among the country's Roma (Gypsy) minority. While the book focuses on the real lives of cops on the beat, its frank portrayal of what in the communist era had been openly termed in government-political circles and by law enforcement authorities as cigánybűnözés (gypsy crime) stirred considerable debate; the term has since fallen out of favor among most political parties in Hungary due to its perceived racist overtones.

Although he himself was a self-professed "independent leftist" who never belonged to a political party, Moldova was openly supportive of communist ideals and was known for his loyalty to the late János Kádár, Hungarian communist leader and General Secretary of the Hungarian Socialist Workers' Party, who ruled the country from 1956 until his forced retirement in 1988. Most famously, Moldova published a biography, Kádár, in which he termed this longest-ruling of all twentieth-century Hungarian political figures a "genius" and suggested that the executions of political prisoners after the 1956 Hungarian Revolution had been justified.

Partial list of works

Fiction 
 Idegen bajnok (Foreign Champion; story collection, 1963)
 Sötét angyal (Dark Angel; novel, 1967)
 A beszélő disznó (The Talking Hog; 1978) – a satire set in a state agricultural cooperative in which a hog named Józsi learns how to talk—and curse.

Nonfiction 
 Az Őrség panasza (1977) – a book about one of Hungary's most cherished regions, the Őrség
 Tisztelet Komlónak (1971) – an homage to one of Hungary's most important coal mining regions
 Akit a mozdony füstje megcsapott (1977) – an inside look at Hungary's railway sector
 A szent tehén: Riport a textiliparról (1980) – a portrait of Hungary's textile industry
 Bűn az élet (1988) – a provocative inside look at Hungarian police late in the communist era, with a particular focus on their handling of "Gypsy crime."
 A végtelen vonal: Legenda a golyóstollról (2001). English translation: Ballpoint: A Tale of Perilous Times, Genius and Grit, and the Invention that Changed the Way We Write (New Europe Books, 2012).
 Kádár János I-II. (2006) – Moldova's provocative reassessment of Hungary's longest-serving twentieth-century ruler, János Kádár
 Keserű Pohár 1. kötet: A magyar borászokról és a magyar borokról. (2011) – a look at Hungarian vintners and their wines.

Published in English 
 Ballpoint: A Tale of Genius and Grit, Perilous Times, and the Invention that Changed the Way We Write, New Europe Books (2012) - 208 pages
 Dark Angel (a novel), Corvina Press (1967) - 285 pages

Sources 
This page started out as a translation of portions of the Hungarian-language Wikipedia page on György Moldova, with biographical and other information added from sources including the Hungarian-language author biography on the website of Budapest's Petőfi Literary Museum (see external references below) and the English translation of Ballpoint (New Europe Books, 2012).

External links 
 The writer’s website
 Moldova’s (Hungarian) biography on the website of the Petofi Literary Museum, Budapest
 Ballpoint: A Tale of Genius and Grit, Perilous Times, and the Invention that Changed the Way We Write

1934 births
2022 deaths
Nazi-era ghetto inmates
Hungarian communists
Hungarian Jews
Hungarian male novelists
Jewish Hungarian-language writers
Hungarian dramatists and playwrights
Romani in Hungary
20th-century Hungarian novelists
20th-century Hungarian male writers
21st-century Hungarian male writers
Hungarian non-fiction writers
Male non-fiction writers
Attila József Prize recipients
Writers from Budapest